Kieren Robert Hutchison (born 9 October 1974) is a New Zealand actor. He was born in Auckland, New Zealand.

Career
Hutchison is best known for playing the roles of Jonathon McKenna in the New Zealand soap opera Shortland Street, Andy Hargrove on One Tree Hill, and Jake Preston on Monarch Cove (2006). He played Ernst Robinson on The Adventures of Swiss Family Robinson (1997) and William Tell on The Legend of William Tell (1998).

He is the creator of the YouTube channel "A Kid Explains History." As of 2022, it has 25,000 subscribers and over 4 million views.

Personal life
He is married to actress Nicole Tubiola with whom he has a son.

Filmography

References

External links
Official website

Living people
1974 births
New Zealand male television actors
New Zealand male soap opera actors
20th-century New Zealand male actors
21st-century New Zealand male actors